Kotes village in Blitar Regency, located on the island of Java in the province of Jawa Timur, Indonesia. In 2010, 1,911 inhabitants lived in the village of Kotes.

External links 
Census results (2010) at Badan Pusat Statistik (in Indonesian)

Villages in Indonesia
East Java